Arthur D. Matheson was a Baptist Pastor who served as a missionary in India from 1920 through 1965 as part of the overseas missionary endeavour of the Canadian Baptist Ministries.

After a four-decade missionary service, Matheson was elected in 1960 as the President of the Convention of Baptist Churches of Northern Circars succeeding A. B. Masilamani.

After nearly five decades of missionary service in India, Matheson left for Canada in 1966.

References

Indian Baptists
Indian Christian theologians
Telugu people
People from East Godavari district
Christian clergy from Andhra Pradesh
Academic staff of the Senate of Serampore College (University)
Convention of Baptist Churches of Northern Circars
Canadian Baptist Ministries missionaries in India
Canadian Baptist Ministries
Year of birth missing
Year of death missing